Stillwater Lake may refer to:
 Stillwater Lake, Nova Scotia, a residential community of the Halifax Regional Municipality, Canada
 Stillwater Lake (Pennsylvania), a reservoir in Pocono Summit, Monroe County, U.S.

See also
 Upper Stillwater Lake and Lower Stillwater Lake, part of Stillwater River (Flathead County, Montana), U.S.